The 30th edition of the Deutschland Tour road bicycle race took place in Germany from 1 to 9 August 2006. Jens Voigt claimed the victory ahead of defending champion Levi Leipheimer.

Classification tables

General classification

King of the Mountains Classification

Points Classification

Young Rider Classification

Best Team

Stages

Prologue - Tuesday 1 August: Düsseldorf, 5.5 km. (ITT)

Stage 1 - Wednesday 2 August: Düsseldorf-Bielefeld, 198 km.

Stage 2 - Thursday 3 August: Minden-Goslar, 181.5 km.

Stage 3 - Friday 4 August: Witzenhausen-Schweinfurt, 203.3 km.

Stage 4 - Saturday 5 August: Heidenheim-Bad Tölz, 203 km.

Stage 5 - Sunday 6 August: Bad Tölz-Seefeld, 192.1 km. 
Because of bad weather on top of Mount Kühtai (Top of the Deutschland Tour 2006 at 2017 meters), the riders asked the organisation before the start to remove it from the Stage, which they did. As a result, the stage was only 160 kilometres long.

Stage 6 - Monday 7 August: Seefeld-St Anton am Arlberg, 196.6 km.

Stage 7 - Tuesday 8 August: Bad Säckingen, 38.2 km. (ITT)

Stage 8 - Wednesday 9 August: Bad Krozingen-Karlsruhe, 172.1 km.

Jersey progress

External links
Race website

2006
2006 UCI ProTour
Deutschland Tour